San Lorenzo al Mare is a comune (municipality) in the Province of Imperia in the Italian region Liguria, located about  southwest of Genoa and about  west of Imperia.

San Lorenzo al Mare borders the following municipalities: Cipressa, Civezza, Costarainera, and Imperia.

Demographic evolution

References

Cities and towns in Liguria
Populated coastal places in Italy